Mixx FM may refer to one of the following radio stations:

Australia 
Ace Radio, owning a conglomerate network in Melbourne, Australia

Philippines 
DZLR in Naga City

See also 
 Mix FM (disambiguation)